Stephen Ellis Garrett, Jr. (November 11, 1974 – February 25, 2008), known professionally as Static Major (and previously as Static), was an American singer, songwriter, and record producer from Louisville, Kentucky. He was a member of the R&B trio Playa, and a songwriter for several artists, including Aaliyah, Ginuwine, Pretty Ricky, and Destiny's Child.

Career 
Garrett started his producing career when he signed Swing Mob. He made a breakthrough working with R&B singer Ginuwine, writing and co-producing the 1996 song "Pony" which became a major hit and a milestone in both Garrett and Timbaland's careers. Garrett later became a member of the Def Jam group Playa, who were most known for their hit single "Cheers 2 U". Playa released an album of the same name in 1998.

After working with Ginuwine, Garrett assisted in producing songs for Nicole Wray for her 1998 debut album, Make It Hot. He would eventually become the lead songwriter for Aaliyah. His songwriting collaborations with Aaliyah include: "Are You That Somebody?", which was featured in the Dr. Dolittle soundtrack, and the Romeo Must Die soundtrack singles "Come Back in One Piece" and her only Billboard Hot 100 number-one single "Try Again". The songs "More than a Woman", "We Need a Resolution", "Rock the Boat", "Loose Rap" (which he was also featured on), "Extra Smooth", "I Refuse", "Read Between the Lines", "Those Were the Days", and "Never No More" were all featured on her third and final studio album Aaliyah.

In 2005, Garrett collaborated with R&B group Pretty Ricky on their song "Juicy". He was featured on Lil Wayne's chart-topping 2008 song "Lollipop", which he co-wrote. The music video for "Lollipop" was dedicated to his memory.

Garrett once reflected on where his inspiration comes from, saying "I stay in the streets, that's where I draw my inspiration [...] If it can't be played in the hood, then it just doesn't work for me. And nobody can hold me on harmony. My whole aura is not your typical R&B aura."

Death 
Garrett died at age 33 at the Baptist Hospital East in Louisville, Kentucky, on February 25, 2008, from complications of a medical procedure.

Posthumous releases 
Garrett was featured posthumously on Drake's 2018 song "After Dark", which peaked at number 41 on the Hot 100.

In 2020, Garrett was featured on Jack Harlow's "Luv Is Dro" which is largely a reworking of Static's own song, also titled "Love Is Dro", which had been previously released in 2018.

On December 17, 2021, a new posthumous single from Aaliyah was released, titled "Poison". The song featured The Weeknd, who was credited as a co-writer alongside Garrett and Belly. "Poison" contains vocals recorded by Aaliyah shortly before her death in 2001. Garrett can be heard delivering background vocals.

Discography

Singles

As a lead artist

As a featured artist

Guest appearances 
 1996 "Gin & Juice" (with DeVante)
 1998 "What Cha Talkin' Bout" (with Timbaland & Magoo) on Tim's Bio: Life from da Bassment
 1998 "Put 'Em On" (with Timbaland & Magoo on Tim's Bio: Life from da Bassment
 2000 "Change the Game" (with Jay-Z) on The Dynasty: Roc La Familia
 2001 "Loose Rap" (with Aaliyah) on Aaliyah
 2001 "Indian Carpe" (with Timbaland & Magoo) on Indecent Proposal
 2001 "I Am Music" (with Timbaland & Magoo) on Indecent Proposal
 2004 "I Came to Bring the Pain" (with Lil' Flip) on U Gotta Feel Me
 2004 "Crank It Up" (with David Banner) on MTA2: Baptized in Dirty Water
 2005 "Juicy" (with Pretty Ricky) on Bluestars
 2007 "Good Weather Music (Never Thought)" (with T-Hud) on Undrafted
 2008 "Lollipop" (with Lil Wayne) on Tha Carter III
 2009 "Gotta Get Me One" (with Twista) on Category F5
 2018 "After Dark" (with Drake and Ty Dolla Sign) on Scorpion
 2020 "Luv Is Dro" (with Jack Harlow and Bryson Tiller) on Thats What They All Say
 2021 "Body Rock" (with 5AM) on You’re Going To Be Fine

References

External links 
Static Major official website
Playa official website
Static Major — Lollipop: A Hard to Swallow Reality on Dubcnn

Static star – Louisville's Alt-Weekly – LEO Weekly

1974 births
2008 deaths
20th-century African-American male singers
21st-century African-American male singers
African-American male singer-songwriters
African-American record producers
American contemporary R&B singers
American hip hop record producers
American hip hop singers
Def Jam Recordings artists
Grammy Award winners for rap music
Musicians from Louisville, Kentucky
Record producers from Kentucky
Singer-songwriters from Kentucky
Southern hip hop musicians
Swing Mob artists